Chen Lihua (born 1941), rendered Chan Laiwa in Cantonese, is the founder and chairman of Fuwah International Group, one of Beijing's largest commercial property developers. In 2014, Forbes ranked her as the 10th richest mainland Chinese, the richest woman in China, and one of only 19 female billionaires in the world who did not inherit their billionaire status. In 2015, touchscreen entrepreneur Zhou Qunfei surpassed Chen as China's richest woman.

Chen is the founder and curator of the China Red Sandalwood Museum.

Early life
Chen Lihua was born in 1941 in the Summer Palace of Beijing, China. She is a descendant of a noble Manchu family of the Qing dynasty. When the Manchu Qing dynasty collapsed, her family lost their estates and became poor.

Rise from poverty
Poverty forced Chen to leave high school and started her own furniture repair business. In the early 1980s, Chen moved to Hong Kong and continue her business of buying and re-selling furniture. Her business in Hong Kong was successful enough that she accumulated enough money to buy 12 villas.

In the late 1980s, she moved back to Beijing to expand her real estate business. She founded Fuwah International Group in the early 1990s. Though its predominant business is real estate, the company also has a diverse portfolio in the fields of agriculture, tourism, electronics, hospitality and red sandalwood art production, etc.

In recent years, Chen has handed over daily management of her ventures to her son, preferring to concentrate on her museum instead.

Cultural contributions and philanthropy
She founded the China Red Sandalwood Museum in 1999, where she invested 20 Billion Yuan. The museum covers an area of 25,000 square meters. She attributed her love of red sandalwood from the childhood years she spent in Summer Palace, where furnishings are made of the timber. She has also donated sandalwood works to museums around the world.

Chen is also known for her social responsibility and philanthropy. Fu Wah donated 130 million yuan for disaster relief in 2005 and 265 million yuan in 2004.

Personal life
Chen is married to Chinese actor Chi Zhongrui. She has one son and two daughters. She now resides in her Chinese Red Sandalwood Museum.

References

Businesspeople from Beijing
1941 births
Living people
Billionaires from Beijing
Female billionaires
Manchu people